William Joseph Hilsman (born March 13, 1932) is a retired United States Army lieutenant general who served as Director of the Defense Information Systems Agency from 1980 to 1983. Born in St. Louis, Missouri, the son of William Hilsman, he graduated from the United States Military Academy in 1954. Hilsman later earned an M.S. degree in electrical engineering from Northeastern University in 1962. He is the father of Air Force Brigadier General Allison A. Hickey.

In 1989, President George H. W. Bush appointed Hilsman as a member of the President's National Security Telecommunications Advisory Committee.

References

1932 births
Living people
People from St. Louis
United States Military Academy alumni
United States Army personnel of the Vietnam War
Northeastern University alumni
United States Army generals
Recipients of the Defense Distinguished Service Medal
George H. W. Bush administration personnel